Kings Engineering College is a private engineering college in Chennai, Kancheepuram District, India. The college was established in the year 2004 by the Educational vision by Mr.Thiru. Selvaraj. The college offers academic scholarship which age students from low income backgrounds to offered college and hostel fees. The college is affiliated to Anna University.

Administration 
Kings Engineering College is managed by the CHARTIAN EDUCATIONAL AND HEALTH TRUST, a Registered Trust of public nature for Education and Charitable purposes. It is managed by the RAJAM GROUP OF COMPANIES, Chennai that also manages Queens Land Amusement Park and the star category Resort Hotel - Pleasant Days Hotel.

References

External links
 Kings Engineering College  Official Website

Engineering colleges in Chennai